Zhangzhou is a prefecture-level city in Fujian Province, China. The prefecture around the city proper comprises the southeast corner of the province, facing the Taiwan Strait and (with Quanzhou) surrounding the prefecture of Xiamen.

Name
Zhangzhou is the atonal pinyin romanization of the city's Chinese name , using its pronunciation in Standard Mandarin. The name derives from the city's former status as the seat of the imperial Chinese Zhang Prefecture. Other romanizations include Chang-chow.

It also appears as Chang-chu,Chiang-chew, or Chiang Chew from the city's local Hokkien name Chiang-chiu.

Geography
The prefecture of Zhangzhou comprises the southeastern corner of the province, surrounding Xiamen. The prefecture of Quanzhou lies to its northeast, Longyan to its northwest, and Shantou in Guangdong to its southwest.

Climate
Zhangzhou has a monsoon-influenced humid subtropical climate (Köppen Cfa), with mild to warm winters and long, very hot and humid summers. The frost-free period lasts 330 days.

History
According to Odoric of Pordenone, Zhangzhou was a prosperous city twice the size of Bologna.

During the early Qing, Zhangzhou was the primary Fujianese port trading with Portuguese Macao and Spanish Manila. For a time, the Portuguese maintained a factory in the city.

During the late Qing, Zhangzhou remained a center of silk, brick, and sugar production with about a million people and extensive internal and maritime trade. Its city wall had a circumference of about  but included a good deal of open ground and farmland. Its streets were paved with granite but badly maintained. The  bridge across the Jiulong River consisted of wooden planks laid between 25 piles of stones at roughly equal intervals. The port of Xiamen in an island at the mouth of the Jiulong principally functioned as a trading center for the produce and wares of Zhangzhou and its hinterland; both suffered economically when Indian tea plantations cratered demand for Fujianese tea in the late 19th century.

The old city of Zhangzhou (now Xiangcheng District) was occupied in April and May 1932 by a column of Communist guerrillas under Mao Zedong. Due to the presence of Western gunboats in Xiamen Bay, arms shipments from the Soviet Union were unable to get up the Jiulong River to Mao's forces and the main Communist bases. Discovering this, Mao retreated from the city, according to some accounts with a substantial amount of loot taken from its residents.

Administrative divisions
Zhangzhou comprises 4 urban districts, and 7 counties.

Xiangcheng District
Longwen District
Longhai District
Changtai District
Dongshan County
Hua'an County
Nanjing County
Pinghe County
Yunxiao County
Zhangpu County
Zhao'an County

Demographics
During the 2020 Chinese census, the entire area of Zhangzhou was home to 5,054,328 inhabitants. Along with the 2,120,178 people of central Xiamen, its urban districts of Xiangcheng, Longwen, Longhai and Changtai, form a single metropolitan area of about 7,284,148 people.

The main language of the Zhangzhou Hokkiens is the local dialect of Min Nan, part of the Southern Min branch of Min Chinese. 

Hakka is also spoken in the rural peasant area of Zhangzhou in the west and south.

Economy

Babao seal paste was invented by the druggist Wei Changan as a traditional medicine in 1673. It was repurposed for artistic use a few years later and gained imperial favor under the Qianlong Emperor. It remains prized for its bright color and pleasant smell.

A major petrochemical plant, producing paraxylene, owned by Taiwan-based Xianglu Group is located in Zhangzhou's Gulei Peninsula. The plant suffered major fires in 2013 and 2015.

Transportation
Two passenger stations serve Zhangzhou:
 Zhangzhou East Railway Station on the older Yingtan–Xiamen Railway, northeast of the city;
 Zhangzhou Railway Station, the junction of the high-speed Xiamen–Shenzhen Railway and Longyan–Xiamen Railway, opened in 2012, south of the city.

Education

Minnan Normal University
Tenfu Tea College

Notable residents
 Chen Yuanguang (657–711), a leader of the movement to sinicize Fujian and northern Guangdong.
 Khaw Soo Cheang (1786–1882), merchant and governor of a Thai province.
 Lim Gu Tong (1895–1976), international author, cultural ambassador and inventor.
 Fang Zhouzi (1967), science writer.

Sister city 
Zhangzhou is twinned with the following regions, cities and towns:
  Palembang, South Sumatra (since 2002)
  Isahaya, Nagasaki
  Date, Iburi Subprefecture
  Gödöllő, Pest County
  Wageningen, Gelderland
  Honolulu, Hawaii

See also
 List of twin towns and sister cities in China
 Yuegang, important seaport during Ming and Ming-Qing transition in morden Zhangzhou and Xiamen

References

External links

Official website 
Historic US Army map of Zhangzhou, 1945

 
Cities in Fujian
Prefecture-level divisions of Fujian